KXVA (channel 15) is a television station in Abilene, Texas, United States, affiliated with Fox and MyNetworkTV. Owned by Tegna Inc., the station broadcasts from a transmitter located in rural southwestern Callahan County. Its operations and local productions are housed at sister station and fellow Fox affiliate KIDY in San Angelo; the two stations are commonly branded as "Fox West Texas" and largely simulcast the same programming, including local newscasts covering both areas.

History
In 1992, Sage Broadcasting Company established K54DT "KDT" (call letters changed to KIDZ-LP in 1996), a translator of KIDY, to serve San Angelo. However, when the NFL came to Fox in 1994, its insufficient coverage meant that Fox sold the rights to air its football package to ABC affiliate KTXS. The wife of one of KIDY's owners, doing business as Star Broadcasting, then filed in 1995 to build a station on channel 15. Four applications were received in total for channel 15, but because the Telecommunications Act of 1996 and subsequent amendments shifted all new commercial broadcast stations to being awarded in auctions, the four parties then were ordered to bid on the allotment. That never came to pass, as the Federal Communications Commission (FCC) approved a settlement agreement clearing the way for the Star Broadcasting application in 1999.

A final construction permit for channel 15 was issued on June 15, 2000, but the call letters KXVA had already been announced, as had been the programming plan: to move Fox to the new full-power station and convert the low-power outlet into a UPN affiliate. The new station's startup was pushed back from a planned September or October 2000 launch due to equipment delays and bad weather affecting the construction of the tower to January 9, 2001. It was the first new full-power TV station in Abilene since KTAB began in October 1979.

In 2008, the station was purchased by Bayou City Broadcasting in a group deal for approximately $3 million. On September 27, 2012, Bayou City Broadcasting announced an agreement to sell KXVA and its seven other television stations to the Dallas-based London Broadcasting Company (the sale price initially was not disclosed). The sale marked a temporary exit from the broadcasting industry for the company's owner DuJuan McCoy, who planned on refocusing his company to acquire major network affiliates in mid-sized markets larger than San Angelo and Abilene. The FCC granted its approval of the sale on November 14; the sale was completed on December 31.

On May 14, 2014, the Gannett Company announced that it would acquire KIDY, KXVA, and four other London Broadcasting stations for $215 million; Gannett CEO Gracia Martore touted that the acquisition would give the company a presence in several fast-growing markets and opportunities for local advertisers to leverage its digital marketing platform. The sale was completed on July 8. 13 months later, on June 29, 2015, the Gannett Company split in two, with one side specializing in print media and the other side specializing in broadcast and digital media. KXVA was retained by the latter company, named Tegna.

News operation
In 2009, KIDY and KXVA began airing simulcasts of the 9 p.m. newscast of KABB, the Fox affiliate in San Antonio, which were augmented in 2010 with a simulcast of KABB's morning newscast. In addition to local news headline updates aired during these programs, KXVA provided hourly local news updates weekdays from 9 a.m. to 7 p.m., with headlines and news information provided by the Abilene Reporter News newspaper.

On January 20, 2014, KXVA debuted Fox News First at Nine, a half-hour 9 p.m. newscast produced from San Angelo, as part of the launch of local news for KXVA and KIDY. The KABB morning news simulcast has been replaced by other programming including The Texas Daily and The Broadcast, news and interview programs produced by its Dallas then-sister station KTXD-TV.

On August 2, 2016, KXVA re-launched its news operation, moving its 6:30 p.m. news to 6:00 and moving its prime time newscast to 10:00 p.m., and introducing a new studio, standalone website, and on-air branding as "Fox 15". By 2019, the two stations had recombined their news operation and branding as Fox West Texas with a half-hour 6 p.m. newscast and an hour-long 9 p.m. newscast. A shared morning show, Wake Up West Texas, aired on both stations until 2020.

Technical information

Subchannels
The station's digital signal is multiplexed:

In 2011, KXVA added a second digital subchannel as a simulcast of KIDZ-LD. On January 25, 2018, KIDZ signed off and KXVA-DT2 became the sole MyNetworkTV affiliate for the Abilene market.

Analog-to-digital conversion
Because it was granted an original construction permit after the FCC finalized the digital television allotment plan on April 21, 1997, the station did not receive a companion channel for a digital television signal. KXVA shut down its analog signal, over UHF channel 15, on February 17, 2009, and "flash-cut" its digital signal into operation UHF channel 15.

Translators
KXVA's signal is relayed on the following translator stations:

 34 Albany
 17 Brownwood

There were two additional translators. KIDT-LD channel 44 at Stamford closed in August 2020 to allow US Cellular to commence 600 MHz cellular service and never reopened on a new channel; the license was surrendered on July 8, 2021. KIDB-LD channel 35 at Sweetwater closed in March 2022.

References

External links 

Television channels and stations established in 2001
XVA
Fox network affiliates
MyNetworkTV affiliates
Cozi TV affiliates
Tegna Inc.
2001 establishments in Texas
Former Gannett subsidiaries